Elizabeth "Buffy" Williams  (born 1 November 1976) is a Welsh politician who is the Labour Member of the Senedd for Rhondda.

She won the seat from former Plaid Cymru leader Leanne Wood in the 2021 Senedd election.

Early life and career
Williams was born and brought up in the Rhondda community of Williamstown, Rhondda Cynon Taf, the daughter of a trade union activist. She left school at the age of sixteen to work in a factory, but continued studying.

Williams is the manager of a community centre, and worked for more than 20 years in the third sector, having set up Canolfan Pentre. Other campaigns she has been involved with include saving the local A&E in the Royal Glamorgan Hospital from a closure proposed by her own party, and helping in response to the floods caused by Storm Dennis.

In March 2021, the Labour Party was criticised for nominating Williams for a Welsh Government award, the St David Awards, after she had been selected as a candidate for the Senedd elections. The Welsh Conservatives asked whether it was appropriate "for the first minister to be seen to be using the prestigious St David Awards to reward his Labour election candidates."

Williams won the Rhondda constituency seat on 6 May 2021 from the former Plaid Cymru leader, Leanne Wood, with a majority of 5,497.

Personal life
She is married with three children and lives in Pentre, the Rhondda.

References

1976 births
Living people

Female members of the Senedd

People from Rhondda Cynon Taf
Welsh Labour members of the Senedd
Wales MSs 2021–2026